Thame Abbey was a Cistercian abbey at Thame in the English county of Oxfordshire.

Thame Abbey was founded in 1137 by Alexander, Bishop of Lincoln. It was dissolved in 1539. Most of the building stone was removed from the site, but the Abbot's House remained standing and was turned into a country house, of which two wings remain, Thame Park, by John Williams, 1st Baron Williams of Thame.

fl. 1460 Richard Lyndesey

References

Monasteries in Oxfordshire
Cistercian monasteries in England
1137 establishments in England
Christian monasteries established in the 12th century
1539 disestablishments in England